John S. Arnick (November 27, 1933 – June 13, 2006) was an American politician from Maryland and a member of the Democratic Party. He served in three separate spans of time as a member of the Maryland House of Delegates, representing Maryland's District 6 and District 7 in Baltimore County. He died in 2006 due to lung cancer.

Education
Arnick graduated from Calvert Hall College in Towson, Maryland.  He then attended and graduated from the University of Baltimore with his bachelor's degree.  He later returned to the University of Baltimore's School of Law and graduated with his LL.B. in 1961.

Career
After college Arnick served in the United States Marine Corps from 1956 until 1959.  After getting his law degree he was admitted to the Maryland Bar in 1962 and was a practicing attorney.

Political career
John Arnick was first involved in politics in 1967 when he became a Magistrate at Large for Baltimore County.  The following year he was elected to office for the first time.  During his time in office he served as Majority Leader from 1971 until 1979 and again from 1978 until 1990.  Arnick also received the Casper R. Taylor, Jr., Founder's Award from the House of Delegates in 2003.  Arnick resigned from the House of Delegates on April 30, 2006, in order to serve on the State Board of Contract Appeals.  He was appointed to that position by former Maryland Governor Robert Ehrlich, but died soon afterward.

His political career stumbled a couple of times.  In 1978 he ran for a state senate position, but lost.  However, he ran for his House seat again in the next election cycle and won.

In 1993 he was nominated by former Maryland governor William Donald Schaefer to a 10-year District Court judge position.  However, he was forced to step down after he was charged with making sexist and racist jokes at a dinner in 1992.  According to The Washington Post, he was well known for his "salty language and flamboyant behaviour".  At the time he had already resigned his seat in the House of Delegates as he had already taken his seat on the judicial bench and was waiting for senate approval.  Fortunately for him the Baltimore County Democratic Central Committee reappointed him back to his House Delegate seat.

In addition to being Majority Leader, Delegate Arnick served on many committees and caucuses including:

Environmental Matters Committee, 2003–06
Rules and Executive Nominations Committee, 1983–92, 1995-06
House Chair, Joint Committee on Legislative Ethics, 2003–06
Joint Commission on the Maryland Port Administration, 2005–06
Legislative Policy Committee, 1969–79, 1987–92, 1994–2005
Chair, Environmental Matters Committee, 1972–79, 1987–90
House Chair, Joint Committee on Administrative, Executive and Legislative Review, 1983–86, 1995–2003
Economic Matters Committee, 1983–87
House Chair, Tort and Insurance Reform Oversight Committee, 1987–92
Special Joint Committee on Energy Pricing, 1990–91
Chair, Judiciary Committee, 1991–92
Commerce and Government Matters Committee, 1994–2003
Chair, House Facilities Committee, 1995–2005
Special Committee on Gaming, 2001
Chair, Baltimore County Delegation, 1969–70
Maryland Legislative Sportsmen's Caucus, 2001–06
Taxpayers Protection Caucus, 2003–06
Maryland Veterans Caucus, 2005–06
National Conference of State Legislatures

Election results

2002 Race for Maryland House of Delegates – District 6
Voters to choose three:
{| class="wikitable"
|-
!Name
!Votes
!Percent
!Outcome
|-
|-
|John S. Arnick Dem.
|17,541
|  20.87%
|   Won
|-
|-
|Joseph J. Minnick, Dem.
|17,530
|  20.85%
|   Won
|-
|-
|Michael H. Weir, Jr., Dem.
|17,958
|  21.36%
|   Won
|-
|-
|Jane Brooks, Rep.
|12,517
|  14.89%
|   Lost
|-
|-
|Bruce Laing, Rep.
|9,448
|  11.24%
|   Lost
|-
|-
|Paul Michael Blitz, Rep.
|8,969
|  10.67%
|   Lost
|-
|Other Write-Ins
|106
|  0.13%
|   Lost
|-
|}

1998 Race for Maryland House of Delegates – District 7
Voters to choose three:
{| class="wikitable"
|-
!Name
!Votes
!Percent
!Outcome
|-
|-
|Jacob J. Mohorovic Jr., Dem.
|16,338
|  23%
|   Won
|-
|-
|Joseph J. Minnick, Dem.
|15,095
|  21%
|   Won
|-
|-
|John S. Arnick, Dem.
|14,385
|  20%
|   Won
|-
|-
|Jane Brooks, Rep.
|9,792
|  14%
|   Lost
|-
|-
|Russell Mirabile, Rep.
|8,947
|  13%
|   Lost
|-
|-
|Gary Adams, Rep.
|6,178
|  9%
|   Lost
|-
|}

1994 Race for Maryland House of Delegates – District 7
Voters to choose three:
{| class="wikitable"
|-
!Name
!Votes
!Percent
!Outcome
|-
|-
|Jacob J. Mohorovic Jr., Dem.
|16,059
|  25%
|   Won
|-
|-
|Joseph J. Minnick, Dem.
|15,880
|  25%
|   Won
|-
|-
|John S. Arnick, Dem.
|14,469
|  23%
|   Won
|-
|-
|Jacqueline W. Madison, Rep.
|9,149
|  14%
|   Lost
|-
|-
|Robert J. Parsons, Rep.
|7,628
|  12%
|   Lost
|-
|}

1990 Race for Maryland House of Delegates – District 7
Voters to choose three:
{| class="wikitable"
|-
!Name
!Votes
!Percent
!Outcome
|-
|-
|Connie C. Galiazzo, Dem.
|14,307
|  27%
|   Won
|-
|-
|Louis L. DePazzo, Dem.
|13,595
|  25%
|   Won
|-
|-
|John S. Arnick, Dem.
|12,249
|  23%
|   Won
|-
|-
|Patricia Ann Mohorovic, Rep.
|8,079
|  15%
|   Lost
|-
|-
|Albert W. Weiss, Rep.
|5,387
|  10%
|   Lost
|-
|}

1986 Race for Maryland House of Delegates – District 7
Voters to choose three:
{| class="wikitable"
|-
!Name
!Votes
!Percent
!Outcome
|-
|-
|Robert R. Staab, Dem.
|18,956
|  29%
|   Won
|-
|-
|Louis L. DePazzo, Dem.
|18,301
|  27%
|   Won
|-
|-
|John S. Arnick, Dem.
|18,244
|  27%
|   Won
|-
|-
|Joseph E. Antonelli, Rep.
|3,661
|  6%
|   Lost
|-
|-
|Walter F. Menear Jr., Rep.
|3,857
|  6%
|   Lost
|-
|}

References

Democratic Party members of the Maryland House of Delegates
1933 births
2006 deaths
University of Baltimore alumni
Politicians from Baltimore
United States Marines
Maryland lawyers
University of Baltimore School of Law alumni
20th-century American politicians
21st-century American politicians
Deaths from lung cancer in Maryland
20th-century American lawyers